Carl Wentzel-Teutschenthal (9 December 1875 – 20 December 1944) was a German farmer and agricultural contractor. He was executed at Plötzensee Prison in Berlin following the 20 July plot to assassinate Adolf Hitler.

See also
List of members of the 20 July plot

External links
German Resistance Memorial Center biography

1875 births
1944 deaths
German agronomists
Executed members of the 20 July plot

People executed by hanging at Plötzensee Prison